The Janmangal Namavali is the name given in Hinduism to the 108 names of God as composed by the Swaminarayan Bhagwan's saint Shatanand Swami

Origin 
Swaminarayan Bhagwan, asked one of his disciples, Shatanand Swami to compose some verses, on chanting, would calm one's mind and protect devotees from evil influences, fear, and obstacles. The result was the Janmangal Namavali, 108 verses consisting of different names of God. Each name refers to a different power or quality attributed to Swaminarayan Bhagwan.

The Verses 

Below is the Janmangal Namavali in full, with the English translations beneath

(Note: Shri: One who has infinite virtues | Namaha: I bow down to)

 Om Shri Shri Krishnãya Namaha - I bow down to Krishna: One who attracts the  mind of others (i.e. ‘karshati iti’)
 Om Shri Shri Vãsudevãya Namaha - One who is ‘Vãsudev’ – God.
 Om Shri Nar-Nãrãyanãya Namaha - One who is ‘NarNarayan Dev’.
 Om Shri Prabhave Namaha - One who is the highest authority and power, and owner of everything.
 Om Shri Bhakti-Dharmãtmajãya Namaha - One who has incarnated as the son of Bhakti and Dharma.
 Om Shri Ajanmane Namaha - One who is not subject to birth due to karmas.
 Om Shri Krishnãya Namaha - One who has a dark, attractive complexion.
 Om Shri Nãrãyanãya Namaha - One whom Ramanand Swami named ‘Narayan Muni’ – meaning, the refuge for His devotees and support of everything.
 Om Shri Haraye Namaha - One who controls Brahmã and all other deities and destroys the miseries of His devotees who remember Him.
 Om Shri Harikrishnãya Namaha - One who is ‘Hari’, meaning one who captivates the mind, and ‘Krishna’, meaning one who destroys the demons or the enemies of His devotees.
 Om Shri Ghanshyamãya Namaha - One who has a complexion like a dark cloud.
 Om Shri Dhãrmikãya Namaha - One who observed dharma from childhood and is therefore the son of Dharma (Dharmadev).
 Om Shri Bhaktinandanãya Namaha - One who is the giver of bliss to Bhakti as her son.
 Om Shri Bruhadvratdharãya Namaha - One who has taken up and observes the great vow of brahmacharya.
 Om Shri Shuddhãya Namaha - One who is Himself the incarnation of purity and is purifier of His devotees.
 Om Shri Radha-Krishneshtadevatãya Namaha - One to whom Radha and Krishna are dear.
 Om Shri Marutsutpriyãya Namaha - One who is the beloved of Hanumanji, the son of the wind-god.
 Om Shri Kãlibhairavãdyatibhishanãya Namaha - One who is serene, yet appears fierce to those like Kalibhairav, etc. who attempt to kill Him.
 Om Shri Jitendriyãya Namaha - One who has complete control over His senses and helps others to attain such control.
 Om Shri Jitãhãrãya Namaha - One who has complete control over His sense of taste and helps others to attain such control.
 Om Shri Tivravairãgyãya Namaha - One who possesses highest vairagya (detachment).
 Om Shri Ãstikãya Namaha - One who inspires faith in God. 
 Om Shri Yogeshvarãya Namaha - One who is the leader of the yogis, their sole aim and giver of (their) desired fruits.
 Om Shri Yogakalãpravruttaye Namaha - One who grants His devotees the perfection in yoga, without their having to undergo rigorous training.
 Om Shri Atidhairyavate Namaha - One whose mind never gets defiled. One who is extremely patient and undisturbed by outer influences. 
 Om Shri Gnãnine Namaha - One who has personal experience of and transmits the knowledge of jiva, ishwar, maya, Brahma and Parabrahma. One who perceives true spiritual knowledge. 
 Om Shri Paramhansãya Namaha - One who is the greatest among the paramhansas.
 Om Shri Tirthkrute Namaha - One who makes places of pilgrimage.
 Om Shri Tairthikãrchitãya Namaha - One who is worshipped by the sadhus residing in the pilgrim places.
 Om Shri Kshamãnidhaye Namaha - One who is an ocean of compassion, mercy and forgiveness.
 Om Shri Sadonnidrãya Namaha - One who is eternally awake.
 Om Shri Dhyãnnishthãya Namaha - One who is continuously engrossed in meditation on His own divine form.
 Om Shri Tapahpriyãya Namaha - One who is fond of performing austerities and inspires others to perform them also.
 Om Shri Siddheshvarãya Namaha - One who is worshipped as God even by those who are accomplished in yoga, austerities and spiritual wisdom.
 Om Shri Svatantrãya Namaha - One who is truly independent of all.
 Om Shri Brahmavidyã-pravartakãya Namaha - One who spreads Brahmavidya (divine knowledge) to all.
 Om Shri Pãshandochhedanapatave Namaha - One who intelligently defeats those who behave immorally by falsely interpreting the Vedas.
 Om Shri Svaswarupãchalsthitaye Namaha - One who is steadfast in His own form.
 Om Shri Prashãntmurtaye Namaha - One who is totally calm and whose mere darshan brings peace to the devotees.
 Om Shri Nirdoshãya Namaha - One who is free of all defects and faults, such as, ego, hypocrisy, greed, anger, etc.
 Om Shri Asuragurvãdi-mohanãya Namaha - One who captivates even evil gurus by His divine acts.
 Om Shri Atikãrunyanayanãya Namaha - One whose eyes overflow with compassion.
 Om Shri Uddhavãdhva-pravartakãya Namaha - One who spreads the teachings of the Uddhav Sampraday founded by Ramanand Swami.
 Om Shri Mahãvratãya Namaha - One who perfectly upholds the five great vows of nishkam (non-lust), nirlobh (non-greed), nisswad (non-taste), nissneh (detachment) and nirman (humility), and who performs severe austerities.
 Om Shri Sãdhushilãya Namaha - One whose behaviour perfectly reflects the saintly character of a God.
 Om Shri Sãdhuvipra-prapujakãya Namaha - One who honours sadhus and Brahmins and inspires others to do the same.
 Om Shri Ahimsayagna-prastotre Namaha - One who established the tradition of yagnas free of animal sacrifices. 
 Om Shri Sãkãrabrahma-varnanãya Namaha - One who spreads the understanding that Brahma and Parabrahma both have divine human forms.
 Om Shri Swãminãrãyanãya Namaha - One who is ‘Swami’ – the Supreme Being – and with ‘Narayan’ – The Supreme-God "Swaminarayan".
 Om Shri Swãmine Namaha - One who is all-powerful.
 Om Shri Kãladoshanivãrakãya Namaha - One who destroys the bad effects of adverse time.
 Om Shri Satshãstravyasanãya Namaha - One who is addicted to reciting and listening to the shastras (holy scriptures).
 Om Shri Sadyasamãdhi-sthitikãrakãya Namaha - One who instantly grants the state of samadhi to His devotees, without their having to perfect the preceding seven stages of yoga. 
 Om Shri Krishnãrchã-sthãpanakarãya Namaha - One who consecrates the murtis of God in mandirs.
 Om Shri Kauladvishe Namaha - One who refutes with logical reasoning the Kaul cults, which preach unrighteous and adulterous behaviour.
 Om Shri Kalitãrakãya Namaha - One who protects His devotees along with their families from the influence of Kali (the dark age).
 Om Shri Prakãsharupãya Namaha - One who is eternally radiant and resides with His divine form in Akshardham.
 Om Shri Nirdambhãya Namaha - One who is totally free from pretence and hypocrisy.
 Om Shri Sarvajivahitãvahãya Namaha - One who does good of all beings.
 Om Shri Bhaktisamposhakãya Namaha - One who has enriched and promoted the practice of bhakti (ninefold devotion) to God.
 Om Shri Vãgmine Namaha - One who lovingly speaks the truths taught by the Vedas.
 Om Shri Chaturvarga-falapradãya Namaha - One who bestows the fruits of the four endeavours: dharma (moral behaviour), arth (wealth), kam (desires) and moksha (liberation).
 Om Shri Nirmatsarãya Namaha - One who is not envious of the progress of others, but rejoices in their success.
 Om Shri Bhaktavarmane Namaha - One who is surrounded by a legion of devotees, whom He protects.
 Om Shri Buddhidãtre Namaha - One who bestows spiritual intellect to help devotees realise His true form.
 Om Shri Atipãvanãya Namaha - One who is absolutely pure and purifies others.
 Om Shri Abuddhihrute Namaha - One who destroys ignorance.
 Om Shri Brahmdhãm-darshakãya Namaha - One who reveals His abode – Brahmadham (Akshardham) – to all His devotees.
 Om Shri Aparãjitãya Namaha - One who cannot be defeated by anyone but is Himself won over by the selfless love of His devotees.
 Om Shri Ãsumudrãnta-satkirtaye Namaha - One whose redemptive fame has spread to the ocean shores.
 Om Shri Shritasansruti-mochanãya Namaha - One who compassionately redeems His devotees from the cycle of births and deaths.
 Om Shri Udãrãya Namaha - One who is extremely generous.
 Om Shri Sahajãnandãya Namaha - One who is naturally full of joy and bliss and gives such joy and bliss to His devotees.
 Om Shri Sãdhvidharma-pravartakãya Namaha - One who promotes righteous living among His women disciples.
 Om Shri Kandarpadarpa-dalanãya Namaha - One who crushed to pieces the ego of Kamdev – the god of lust.
 Om Shri Vaishnavakratu-kãrakãya Namaha - One who established the practice of yagna – sacrifices – free from killing and offering animals, as per the true Vaishnav tradition.
 Om Shri Panchãyatana-sanmãnãya Namaha - One who directs His devotees to honour the five deities – Vishnu, Shiv, Ganapati, Parvati and Surya.
 Om Shri Naishthikavrata-poshakãya Namaha - One who practices absolute brahmacharya and inspires others to do so also.
 Om Shri Pragalbhãya Namaha - One who is ever enthusiastic and always ready to debate with great scholars.
 Om Shri Nispruhãya Namaha - One who is detached from all desires of material enjoyment.
 Om Shri Satyapratignãya Namaha - One who always keeps His promises.
 Om Shri Bhaktavatsalãya Namaha - One who has infinite love for all His followers.
 Om Shri Aroshanãya Namaha - One who is free of anger.
 Om Shri Dirghadarshine Namaha - One who has unparalleled foresight and vision.
 Om Shri Shadurmi-vijayakshamãya Namaha - One who has conquered the six physical and emotional sensations of thirst, hunger, grief, infatuation, old age and death.
 Om Shri Nirahankrutaye Namaha - One who is egoless and dissolves the ego of others.
 Om Shri Adrohãya Namaha - One who has no hatred nor maligns anyone, i.e. He is a friend of all.
 Om Shri Rujave Namaha - One who is soft-natured (i.e. has compassion, love, etc.).
 Om Shri Sarvopakãrakãya Namaha - One who obliges all without expecting anything in return.
 Om Shri Niyãmakãya Namaha - One who controls everything.
 Om Shri Upashamasthitaye Namaha - One who has attained complete peace and tranquility by having control over His senses.
 Om Shri Vinayavate Namaha - One who is naturally humble and polite.
 Om Shri Gurave Namaha - One who is the guru of Brahmã and all other gods whom He taught the Vedas and thus destroyed everyone’s ignorance.
 Om Shri Ajãtvairine Namaha - One who has no enemies in His life.
 Om Shri Nirlobhãya Namaha - One who has no greed or desire to hoard things.
 Om Shri Mahãpurushãya Namaha - One who is the greatest among all men and possesses the 32 virtues of the great.
 Om Shri Ãtmadãya Namaha - One gives His all, including His Ãtmã (Aksharbrahma) to His devotees.
 Om Shri Akhanditãrsha-maryãdãya Namaha - One who never transgresses the moral codes prescribed by the rishis in the shastras and neither does He allow His followers to transgress them.
 Om Shri Vyãsasiddhãnta-bodhakãya Namaha - One who sheds true light on the wisdom and principles taught by Vyas Muni.
 Om Shri Manonigraha-yuktignãya Namaha - One who teaches His devotees various ways and means to control the mind.
 Om Shri Yamaduta-vimochakãya Namaha - One who saves His devotees from the clutches of the servants of Yama.
 Om Shri Purnakãmãya Namaha - One who Himself is totally fulfilled yet fulfills the desires of His devotees.
 Om Shri Satyavãdine Namaha - One who always upholds and speaks the truth.
 Om Shri Gunagrãhine Namaha - One who always imbibes the virtues of others.
 Om Shri Gatasmayãya Namaha - One who is egoless.
 Om Shri Sadãchãra-priyatarãya Namaha - One who is immensely fond of pure and righteous living and inspires His followers to live similar lives.
 Om Shri Punyashravana-kirtanãya Namaha - One whose name and discourses are purifying by their very utterances.
 Om Shri Sarvamangala-sadrupa-nãnã-guna-vicheshtitãya Namaha - One whose divine murti, divine virtues and divine exploits spread goodness among all and lead them to final (ultimate) liberation.

See also
 Shikshapatri - Code of Conduct written by Swaminarayan
 Vachanamrut - Questions and Answers from Swaminarayan

Swaminarayan Sampradaya
Vaishnavism